Mandihal is a village in Dharwad district of Karnataka, India.

Demographics 
As of the 2011 Census of India there were 309 households in Mandihal and a total population of 1,490 consisting of 792 males and 698 females. There were 231 children ages 0-6.

References

Villages in Dharwad district